Garraveh or Garaveh may refer to:
 Garraveh 1, Kermanshah Province
 Garraveh 2, Kermanshah Province
 Garaveh, Kurdistan